Andriy Mykolayevich Hirenko (or Andrei Nikolayevich Girenko) was a Soviet and Ukrainian politician from before the dissolution of the Soviet Union. He headed the Komsomol of Ukraine and was the 1st Party Secretary in Kherson and Crimea.

Hirenko was born in 1936 as Adolf which he changed in 1972. He died in late December 2017.

References

External links
 Crimean Oblast at the Handbook on history of the Communist Party and the Soviet Union 1898–1991
 Ukraine at worldstatesmen.org
 Brief bio at the Kherson regional universal science library
 Hirenko at the Great Biographic Encyclopedia
 Hirenko at hrono.ru

1936 births
2017 deaths
Politicians from Kryvyi Rih
Central Committee of the Communist Party of the Soviet Union members
Communist Party of Ukraine (Soviet Union) politicians
Eighth convocation members of the Verkhovna Rada of the Ukrainian Soviet Socialist Republic
Ninth convocation members of the Verkhovna Rada of the Ukrainian Soviet Socialist Republic
Tenth convocation members of the Verkhovna Rada of the Ukrainian Soviet Socialist Republic
Eleventh convocation members of the Soviet of the Union
Recipients of the Order of Lenin
Recipients of the Order of the Red Banner of Labour
Governors of Kherson Oblast
Governors of Crimean Oblast
Komsomol of Ukraine members
Kryvyi Rih National University alumni
Kyiv Higher Party School alumni
Burials in Troyekurovskoye Cemetery